Behaviour Research and Therapy is a monthly peer-reviewed scientific journal covering behavior therapy. It was established by Hans Eysenck in 1963 as the world's first journal dedicated to behavior therapy. It is published by Elsevier and the editor-in-chief is Michelle Craske (University of California at Los Angeles). According to the Journal Citation Reports, the journal has a 2017 impact factor of 4.134.

References

External links

Behavior therapy
Psychotherapy journals
Publications established in 1963
Monthly journals
Elsevier academic journals
English-language journals